Weichold is a surname. Notable people with the surname include:

Eberhard Weichold (1891–1960), German naval officer
Mark Weichold, American engineer

German-language surnames